Torgeir Eikstad Micaelsen (born 20 May 1979 in Bergen) is a Norwegian politician for the Labour Party. He was elected to the Norwegian Parliament from Buskerud in 2005. He had previously served as a deputy representative during the term 2001–2005. Micaelsen made it to some fame as "the man who got slapped by Martin Schanche". The incident happened during a 2003 school debate in Drammen.

On the local level Micaelsen was a member of Nedre Eiker municipal council from 1999 to 2003.

References

External links
 Torgeir Micaelsen gets slapped by Martin Schanche

1979 births
Living people
Members of the Storting
Buskerud politicians
Labour Party (Norway) politicians
University of Oslo alumni
21st-century Norwegian politicians
Politicians from Drammen